Etisalat Egypt S.A.E. is the third mobile operator to enter the Egyptian market and the first integrated operator for telecom services in Egypt. It officially started its business in 2007 and managed to attract one million subscribers in the first fifty days of the launch of its operations. Etisalat was the first company to provide 3.5G services, and was also the first to provide 4G services without the need for its customers to change their SIM cards, in addition to constantly developing its network.

Etisalat Egypt is one of the companies operating under Emirates Telecommunication Group Company, which was established in 1976 and later expanded to operate in 16 countries across the Middle East, Africa and Asia, serving more than 148 million subscribers with its services.

Etisalat provides mobile, fixed line, mobile Internet and fixed Internet services.

Etisalat's Share in the Egyptian Market 
Within two years of operation, the company was able to attract more than 15 million subscribers.

Investments 
Etisalat spent more than 50 billion pounds over a period of 12 years to develop its network and infrastructure. The company's capital also increased by approximately LE 4.5 billion, raised from the company's main shareholders, to make the total capital LE 19.5 billion. These ongoing investments have enabled Etisalat to become the prime company in the Egyptian telecommunications market.

The ownership structure of Etisalat Egypt is divided into seven entities: Etisalat International Egypt Co. Ltd. – Emirates 66% of capital, Post for Investments S.A.E – Egypt 20%, DAS Holding 5%, DIFC LLC – UAE 5%, Saudi Tech Invest Com 1.5%, Al Naboodah Investments – UAE 1.5%, and Mawarid Finance – UAE 1%.

Sponsorship of Al-Ahly Sporting Club 
On October 4, 2011, Etisalat signed a contract to sponsor Al-Ahly Club's shirt for three years. The signing was held in the presence of the company's chairman, Eng. Gamal El-Sadat, its CEO Saleh Al-Abdooli, and a number of company leaders, in addition to Al-Ahly Club President Hassan Hamdi and Al-Ahly Club's Vice President Captain Mahmoud Al-Khatib, and the club's technical director, Manuel Jose. Etisalat sponsored Al-Ahly Club shirt for three years for LE 135 million, after a rife competition with Vodafone. The bid against Vodafone had reached LE 130 million, and Etisalat was able to seal the deal after raising the bid by LE 5 million.

On October 19, 2022, Etisalat announced their sponsorship for the second time for Al Ahly on a 4-year deal worth of 800 million EGP, outlasting WE as the club's main sponsor

See also 
 Telecom Egypt
 Vodafone Egypt
 Orange Egypt

References 

 
 
 

Etisalat
2007 establishments in Egypt
Telecommunications companies established in 2007
Mobile phone companies of Egypt
Internet service providers of Egypt
Internet service providers of the United Arab Emirates